Venice International University (VIU) is an international center for higher education and research located on the island of San Servolo, in Venice, Italy.

It was established on December 15, 1995 as a consortium of five Universities and two Italian Institutions.

Since its foundation, Venice International University has grown to include a total of twenty members (as of 2020), in collaboration and with support of the Metropolitan City of Venice, Italy (Italian: Città metropolitana di Venezia).

 Boston College of the United States
 Duke University of the United States
 Ludwig Maximilian University of Munich, Germany (German: Ludwig-Maximilians-Universität)
 Tel Aviv University of Israel
Korea University, Seoul, Republic of Korea
 Tsinghua University of Beijing, China
 Ca' Foscari University of Venice, Italy (Italian: Università Ca' Foscari Venezia)
 University IUAV of Venice, Italy (Italian: Università IUAV di Venezia)
 European University at Saint Petersburg, Russia
 Waseda University of Tokyo, Japan
 University of Padua, Italy (Italian: Università degli Studi di Padova)
 University of Bordeaux, France
 National Research Council (Italy)
 University of Lausanne, Switzerland
 Institut National de la Recherche Scientifique of Quebec City, Canada (English: National Institute of Scientific Research)
 University of Rome Tor Vergata, Italy (Italian: Università degli Studi di Roma "Tor Vergata")
 KU Leuven of Belgium. (Dutch: Katholieke Universiteit Leuven)
 Stellenbosch University, South Africa
 University of Exeter, United Kingdom
 University of Ljubljana, Slovenia

SHSS - School of Humanities and Social Sciences
The School of Humanities and Social Sciences (SHSS) offers university courses, intensive seminars, extra-curricular and co-curricular activities and summer schools during the two academic semesters (Fall and Spring) that are held every year. All courses are offered in English by professors from the Member Universities and they are open to all students in the Member Universities.

TEDIS Center
TEDIS (Center for Studies on Technologies in Distributed Intelligence Systems) is a research center established within Venice International University in 1999. The center carries out research on innovation and competitiveness, under the supervision of an international management committee. TEDIS has also developed a joint research program on industrial districts, globalization, and global value chains in cooperation with Duke University Center on Globalization, Governance and Competitiveness.

TEDIS research focuses on four main areas:

 Industrial Districts, Technologies and Networks
 SMEs, Local Clusters and Internationalization
 Creativity, Design and Innovation
 Transport, Logistics and Supply Chain Management

TEN Center
The Center for Thematic Environmental Networks (TEN) is a training and research center in the field of environment and sustainable development. In 2003, the Italian Ministry of Environment, Land and Sea selected TEN Center as the scientific partner for its Capacity Building activity within the Sino-Italian Cooperation Program for Environmental Protection as well as for the Course on Sustainability for East European countries, Central Asia and the Black Sea Region.

VIU Campus

Venice International University is located on the island of San Servolo, in buildings that were once a monastery and were then turned into a military hospital and later on into a psychiatric hospital which was disbanded in 1987. In 1995 the buildings underwent a meticulous restoration work and the island now offers a park with sport grounds, a cafeteria, a bar and some works of art by contemporary international artists, such as Kan Yasuda, Pietro Consagra, Fabrizio Plessi and Sandro Chia. VIU facilities include lecture rooms, conference and seminar rooms, a library, pc rooms and broadband wi-fi connection. A public boat service connects the island to Venice historical center.

Notable people
Prominent scholars who have taught at Venice International University include:
Caroline Bruzelius, Professor of Art and Art History
Orin Starn, Professor of Cultural Anthropology and History
Kristine Stiles
Josep Montserrat i Torrents

References

External links
 Official website
 Venice International University on Facebook
 Venice International University on Flickr
 Venice International University on Twitter

Universities in Italy
Education in Venice